Back to Basics or variants may refer to:

Music

Albums
Back to Basics (Billy Bragg album), 1987
Back to Basics (Alan Hull album), 1994
Back to Basics (Anvil album), 2004
Back to Basics (Beenie Man album), 2004
Back to Basics (Christina Aguilera album), 2006, or the title track, "Intro (Back to Basics)"
Back to Basics Tour, a concert tour by Christina Aguilera
Back to Basics: Live and Down Under, a 2008 concert DVD by Christina Aguilera
Back to Basics (Bill Wyman album), 2015
Back to Basics (Maze album), 1993
Back 2 Basics (Sway & King Tech album), 2005
Back 2 Basics (Diljit Dosanjh album), 2012
Back 2 Base X, a 2006 album by Hed PE
Back to Basics: The Essential Collection 1971–1992, an album by Olivia Newton-John
Back to Basics, a 1983 album by The Reddings
Back to Basics, a 1983 album by The Temptations
Back to Basics, a 1986 album by The Manhattans
Back to Basics, a 2008 album by Dr. Alban
Back to Basics, 2004 album by Mike Metheny
Back to the Basics (EP), a 2013 EP by Twista
Back to the Basics (album), a 2017 album by Rich Homie Quan 
BTTB (album), 1999 album by Ryuichi Sakamoto
Back 2 da Basics, 2006 album by Yo Gotti
Back to the Basic (EP), 2010 album by Rain

Songs
"Back to Basics" (song), a song by Headie One
"Back to Basics", a song by The Shapeshifters from Sound Advice

Other uses in music
Back to Basics, a touring clubnight founded in Leeds in 1991 by Dave Beer

Other uses
Back to Basics (campaign), a 1993 UK initiative to relaunch the government of John Major
Traditional education, or back-to-basics, long-established customs in schools

See also
Back to the Basics (disambiguation)